The 1966 Formula One season was the 20th season of FIA Formula One motor racing. It featured the 1966 World Championship of Drivers and the 1966 International Cup for F1 Manufacturers which were contested concurrently over a nine-race series that commenced on 22 May and ended on 23 October. The season saw the "return to power" with the introduction of the '3 litre formula', doubling maximum engine capacity from 1.5 litres.  Jack Brabham won the World Championship of Drivers and Brabham-Repco was awarded the International Cup for F1 Manufacturers.

The season also included a number of non-championship races for Formula One cars.

Championship summary
The season was the first of the '3 litre formula', which saw maximum engine capacity doubled from the previous season. British constructors were forced to look elsewhere after Climax's withdrawal from racing. Under new regulations, cars completing less than 90% of the race distance were not classified and did not receive points, even if they finished in the top six. Also, the maximum race distance was reduced from 500 km to 400 km.

Jack Brabham took his third and final Drivers' Championship, this time in a car of his own manufacture with an Australian-engineered Repco V8 engine. In winning the championship in his own car, Australian Brabham became the first and (as of ) the only driver to ever win the World Championship in a car carrying his own name (the BT19 and BT20 models used were designed by Brabham's business partner Ron Tauranac). It is also the first time in the history of the World Championship dating back to  that a non-European or British car had won the championship. Although both Jack Brabham and his teammate, New Zealander Denny Hulme both retired from the season opening Monaco Grand Prix (won by Jackie Stewart in his BRM), Brabham with their Oldsmobile-based Repco engine caught the rest of the teams on the hop with its speed and reliability. "Black Jack" finished fourth in Belgium, before winning his first race since the 1960 Portuguese Grand Prix by winning the French Grand Prix at Reims (the last time the Reims-Gueux circuit was used in Formula One). He then won the next three Grands Prix in Britain, Holland and Germany to make it four wins in succession and virtually secure his third championship win (only a drivers five best results counted towards the championship). With Hulme finishing fourth in the Drivers' Championship with 18 points with a second in Britain and thirds in France, Italy and Mexico, Brabham won the International Cup for F1 Manufacturers with 42 points, 11 in front of second-placed Ferrari.

Bruce McLaren (Bruce McLaren Motor Racing, later to become the successful McLaren team, the only team from 1966 other than Ferrari who are still in Formula One as of ) and Dan Gurney (Anglo American Racers) emulated Brabham by building their own cars, though with little initial success.

BRM and Lotus used 2 litre engines for much of the season, their 3 litre designs not being ready. BRM's new H16 engine was largely unsuccessful, although Jim Clark used one in his Lotus 43 to win at Watkins Glen.  World Champion John Surtees was the only driver other than Jack Brabham who won more than one race in the season. He won the second round at Spa-Francorchamps for Ferrari, before later winning the final round in Mexico City driving a Cooper-Maserati V12. Ferrari's Italian driver Ludovico Scarfiotti gave the Tifosi something to cheer about when he drove his Ferrari 312 to victory in the Italian Grand Prix at Monza. Ferrari had a double celebration at Monza as Scarfiotti's teammate Mike Parkes finished 5.8 seconds behind in second place, just holding out third placed Denny Hulme by 0.3 seconds.

In an era of Grand Prix racing where driver safety was only just starting to be a concern, Briton John Taylor died of his injuries after a crash with Jacky Ickx during the German Grand Prix at the Nürburgring.

During the Belgian Grand Prix at the 14.120 km (8.770 mi), wet Spa-Francorchamps circuit, future triple World Champion Jackie Stewart crashed his BRM at the high speed Masta Kink. Stewart lay trapped under his car in a pool of leaking fuel for 25 minutes as both Graham Hill and Bob Bondurant (who had both gone off the circuit nearby) borrowed a spectator's toolkit to free the Scotsman. Following his crash Stewart became a strong advocate of improving driver safety in not only Grand Prix but motor racing in general with things like vastly improved on-track medical facilities, of which there were virtually none at Spa at the time of his crash.

Championship schedule

Championship teams and drivers
The following teams and drivers competed in the 1966 FIA World Championship.

 Pink background denotes F2 entrants to the German Grand Prix

World Drivers' Championship standings

Points towards the 1966 World Championship of Drivers were awarded on a 9–6–4–3–2–1 basis for the first six places at each race. Only the best five race results could be retained by each driver.

1 – Ineligible for Formula One points, because he drove with a Formula Two car.

International Cup for F1 Manufacturers standings

Points were awarded on a 9–6–4–3–2–1 basis at each round with only the best five round results retained. Only the best placed car from each manufacturer at each round was eligible to score points.

Bold results counted to championship totals.

Non-championship races
Four other Formula One races  were held in 1966, which did not count towards the World Championship.

Grand Prix – the movie of the 1966 Formula One season
The film Grand Prix is a fictionalized version of the 1966 season, which includes footage of the actual races edited together with footage of actors.

Notes

References

External links
 Results and images at f1-facts.com
 The Formula One Archives at www.silhouet.com

Formula One seasons